A600 may refer to:
 Amiga 600, home computer released in 1992
 A600, the contact rating of smaller NEMA contactors and relays
 RotorWay A600 Talon, an American Helicopter design